Boxabl is an American housing construction technology company based in Las Vegas, Nevada. It was founded in 2017 by Paolo Tiramani, Galiano Tiramani and Kyle Denman to supply accessory dwelling units (ADUs).

History
Boxabl was started in 2017 by Paolo Tiramani, an industrial designer and mechanical engineer who holds over 150 patents, his son Galiano Tiramani and mechanical engineer Kyle Denman. The company started with $2 million by the co-founders and has raised a total of $150M in funding over 4 rounds, as of September 2022. Paolo Tiramani's Build IP LLC licenses patents to Boxabl.  The company’s initial production facility was designed by Porsche.

In September 2020 the company received its first order, a federal contract for more than $9 million to build and deliver 156 casitas for Camp Justice, the Guantanamo military commission, to hold lawyers and juries for detainee trials. Galiano Tiramani said "We didn't even have a factory or anything" when the order was placed. The units ended up leaky and moldy. The company also participated as an exhibitor in the International Builders' Show, which was held in Las Vegas in January 2020. In May 2021, CBS News reported on Boxabl's appearance at that year's TinyFest California small home show.

After Boxabl hinted that Elon Musk had ordered a Boxabl unit in 2020, the company began to receive media attention for it in August 2021. Musk confirmed his purchase in September 2021.

In May 2022, the company announced a partnership agreement with homebuilder DR Horton, which included an investment and resource sharing, including a phase 1 order of 100 Casita homes.

In 2022, the company opened its second factory building, though in early 2023 it remained unequipped for production.

Boxabl's revenue for the first half of 2022 was $7.6 million, with a net loss of $31 million.

The Pronghorn Group purchased 176 casitas in 2022 and has received "dozens" of them to use as workforce for the Bagdad copper mine in Bagdad, Arizona.

Controversy
On March 3, 2023, Business Insider released an article titled "Tiny Homes, Big Problems", which outlined various governance, production and budgeting issues within the firm. This article identified serious defects in spend management, such as significantly above market salaries for executives and Paolo Tiramani's current romantic interest serving as the accounting department for the firm. Business Insider's investigation also revealed that Boxabl spent $15,750,000 to build an order, for which it received $7,800,000, calling into question Boaxabl's claims of producing low cost housing at scale.

Products

Boxabl provides pre-fabricated homes, called Casita, which have walls, a floor and roof that fold into each other to form a self-contained transportable unit. The homes can be unpacked and assembled in less than an hour. The homes are manufactured in an assembly line similar to automobile assembly lines. The houses are made with materials including steel, ceramic boards and expanded polystyrene foam.

The company's flagship model is a 375 square foot $50,000 home that ships in an eight foot long container. Various models can be stacked and configured into a variety of configurations. The company reported that it could produce a new home every 90 minutes, though in a year, the company built under 400 homes. By early 2023 there were 160,000 entries on the casita waitlist with $5.4 million in deposits, though $1 million in deposits had been refunded.

In 2023 at the International Builders Conference, Boxabl showcased a new two-story home containing three bedrooms, two and a half baths, and an outdoor patio.

Boxabl also has plans to introduce house styles such as multifamily and suburban mansion designs.

Operations
Boxabl is headquartered in Las Vegas, Nevada, and has a factory in Northern Las Vegas. Paolo Tiramani is the company's CEO.

Hamid Firooznia was on Boxabl's three-member board from June 2020 until sometime after January 10 2023. He had been actively involved with the Iranian shell companies that illegally owned 650 Fifth Avenue since at least 2017. Galiano said "This is just a guy that, you know, we have a lot of respect for, who is giving solid advice."

References

External links

Construction
2017 establishments in Nevada